Thomas Biketi (born 31 December 1983 in Kenya) is a Kenyan former footballer. He has plied his trade in a variety of countries- Kenya, Ethiopia, Bangladesh, Nepal, and Singapore.

Nepal and Karuturi

Helping Jawalkhel Youth Club to a three-match winning streak in the Nepal National League, Biketi's club descended to fourth place by the end of the season, accruing 16 points in total. Alongside Gerald Mukonza, the defender was poised to join Karuturi Sports F.C. in January 2012 but the transfer was delayed because Biketi was still competing for promotion in the play-offs for Jawalkhel Youth Club. Ultimately, by late February, the Kenyan sealed the move, making his debut in a 2-0 victory over Chemelil Sugar F.C. in which he was complimented by his coach. Before his debut, Biketi was supposed to have adapted to the clubs style of play and environment.

References

Association football defenders
Living people
1983 births
Kenyan footballers
Kenyan expatriate footballers
Kenya international footballers
Expatriate footballers in Singapore
Expatriate footballers in Bangladesh
Expatriate footballers in Nepal